The zenith is the point in the sky that appears directly above the observer.

Zenith or Zénith may also refer to:
Summit, a point on a surface that is higher in elevation than all points immediately adjacent to it

Automotive
 Zenith Carburettor Company (British), a British carburetor maker
 Zenith Carburetor Company, an American carburetor company, unrelated to the British firm

Aviation
 Ellipse Zenith, a French hang glider
 Zenith, a balloon flown to a record altitude of over 8,000 meters in 1875; see timeline of aviation—19th century (1870s)
 Zenith Aircraft Company, a manufacturer of light aircraft

Business
 Zenith Administrators, Inc. and Zenith American Solutions, respectively predecessor and successor companies of American Benefit Plan Administrators
 Zenith Bank, a Nigerian bank
 Zenit (camera), a Russian camera brand produced by KMZ (spelled as Zenith in some English-language literature)
 Zenith Data Systems, computer hardware company
 Zenith Education Group, a subsidiary of Educational Credit Management Corporation which operates colleges in the United States
 Zenith Electronics, a radio and television manufacturer
 Zenith Insurance Company, an American insurance company
 Zenith Motorcycles, a now defunct British motorcycle manufacturer
 Zenith Oilfield Technology Limited, a British oilfield service company
 Zenith (watchmaker), a Swiss watchmaker
 Zenith, a Japanese make of binoculars
 Zenith, a crusher manufacturer in Shanghai, China

Entertainment
 , the common name for a series of indoor arenas, all similar in design, in France (15 at present)
 Zénith Paris, the first and most famous of the venues
 Zénith d'Orléans
 Zénith de Strasbourg
 Zenith Brass, a youth brass choir in Michigan, US
 Zenith (building), a culture and exhibition centre in Munich, Germany
 Zenith, a computer game by Nasir Gebelli
Zenith Productions, a defunct British independent film and television production company

Fiction
 Zenith (film), a 2010 American film
 "The Zenith" (Voltron: Legendary Defender), a 2018 eighth season episode
 Monsieur Zenith, a villain in the Sexton Blake series of detective pulp fiction
 Zenith (comics), a superhero comic series written by Grant Morrison that first appeared in 2000 AD
 Zenith, Winnemac, a city in Sinclair Lewis's fictional state of Winnemac, and the setting for his 1922 novel Babbitt
 Zenith, a city in the TV series Under the Dome which is accessible from within the Dome by an underground portal
 Zenith Caste, caste in the role-playing game Exalted
 Zenith Castle, or Zenithia, a sky castle from the Dragon Quest video game series
 Zenith, a book written by Julie Bertagna
 Zenith, a literary magazine produced by The Key School
 Zenith, the currency used in the universe of Walter Jon Williams' Dread Empire's Fall series
 Zenith Carrierzord, a zord in Power Rangers Lost Galaxy that was formerly the Shark Galactabeast
 Zenith, a character in the book series Emily the Strange
 Zenith, the home planet of Winx Club member Tecna, the fairy of technology
 Zenith, the final and most powerful sword in the video game Terraria

Music
 Zenith (Grayskul album)
 Zenith (Alfie Arcuri album)
 "Zenith", a song on the album Starbound Beast by Huntress
 "Under Zenith", a song on the album Naveed by Our Lady Peace
 The Zenith Passage, a technical death metal band from the United States
 "Zenith" (After Forever song), sixth song from the album Decipher, by After Forever, a gothic metal band from Netherlands
 "Zenith" (Ghost song), an extra song from the album Meliora, the third album from Ghost band
 "Zenith" (Kavinsky song), a song from the album Reborn
 "The Zenith", a song by Starflyer 59 from Silver
 Zenith, an album by Enforcer

Ships
 HMS Zenith, the name of various ships of the British Royal Navy and of the Royal Naval Volunteer Reserve Division at Southampton
 MV The Zenith, a cruise ship
 USS Zenith (SP-61), a patrol vessel that served in the United States Navy from 1917 to 1918

Places
 Zenith, Georgia, unincorporated community in the United States
 Zenith, Illinois, unincorporated community in the United States
 Zenith, Kansas, unincorporated community in the United States
 Zenith, North Dakota, unincorporated community in the United States
 Zenith, Pennsylvania, unincorporated community in the United States
 Zenith, Tennessee, unincorporated community
 Zenith, West Virginia, unincorporated community in the United States
 Zenith City, nickname of Duluth, Minnesota, United States
 Zenith Heights, Michigan, an unincorporated community

Other uses
 Zenith (1985 painting), painting by Jean-Michel Basquiat and Andy Warhol
 Zenith (magazine), a German magazine of Arabic and Islamic studies
 Zénith FC, professional football club based in Cap-Haïtien, Haiti
 Zenith number, also known as Enterprise or WX, referring to a toll-free telephone service
 Zenith camera, an astronomic or geodetic instrument which is directed exactly to the zenith
 Zenith Plateau, or Zenith Seamount, an undersea bathymetric high beneath the Indian Ocean
 Zenith Go, or Zen, computer Go program
 Zenith Jones Brown, an American crime fiction writer

See also
 Zenit (disambiguation)